Sunan Ibn Mājah is one of the six major Sunni hadith collections (Kutub al-Sittah). The Sunan was authored by Ibn Mājah (born 824 CE, died 887CE).

Description
It contains 4341 aḥādīth in 32 books (kutub) divided into 1,500 chapters (abwāb). Some 1329 hadith are only found in it, and not in the other five canonical works. About 20 of the traditions it contains were later declared to be forged; such as those dealing with the merits of individuals, tribes or towns, including Ibn Mājah's home town of Qazwin.

Views
Sunnis regard this collection as sixth in terms of authenticity of their Six major Hadith collections. Although Ibn Mājah related hadith from scholars across the eastern Islamic world, neither he nor his Sunan were well known outside of his native region of northwestern Iran until the 5th/11th century.  Muḥammad ibn Ṭāhir al-Maqdisī (d. 507/1113) remarked that while Ibn Mājah's Sunan was well regarded in Rayy, it was not widely known among the broader community of Muslim jurists outside of Iran. It was also Muḥammad b. Ṭāhir who first proposed a six-book canon of the most authentic Sunni hadith collections in his Shurūṭ al-aʾimma al-sitta, which included Ibn Mājah's Sunan alongside Sahih Bukhari, Sahih Muslim, Sunan Abu Dawud, Sunan Nasai, and Jami al-Tirmidhi. Nonetheless, consensus among Sunni scholars concerning this six-book canon, which included Ibn Mājah's Sunan, did not occur until the 7th/13th century, and even then this consensus was largely contained to the Sunni scholarly community in the eastern Islamic world. Scholars such as al-Nawawi (d. 676/1277) and Ibn Khaldun (d. 808/1405) excluded Sunan Ibn Mājah from their lists of canonical Sunni hadith collections, while others replaced it with either the Muwaṭṭaʾ of Imām Mālik or with the Sunan ad-Dārimī. It was not until Ibn al-Qaisarani's formal standardization of the Sunni hadith cannon into six books in the 11th century that Ibn Majah's collection was regarded the esteem granted to the five other books.

Contents
Editor, Muhammad Fu'ād 'Abd al-Bāqī's 1952-53 Cairo publication, in 2 volumes,  provides the standard topical classification of the hadith Arabic text.
The book is divided into 37 volumes.

See also
 List of Sunni books
 Sahih Bukhari
 Sahih Muslim
 Sunan Abu Dawood
 Jami al-Tirmidhi
 Al-Sunan al-Sughra
 Muwatta Imam Malik

References

External links

 Sunan Ibn Majah online at Sunnah.com
Sunan ibn Majah – English translation of Sunan ibn Majah

9th-century Arabic books
Sunni literature
Hadith collections
Sunni hadith collections